Aggavaṃsa of Arimaddana (modern Bagan, Burma) was the author of the Saddanīti, a grammar of the Pāli language, specifically the text of the Buddhist scriptures, the Tipiṭaka.  The work was completed in 1154, CE and was taken to Laṅka (Ceylon) a few years after its completion.

It can be seen as a descriptive grammatical work. It consists of 28 chapters with the first 19 being entitled Mahāsaddanīti (The Greater Guidance of Sadda) and the remaining 9 chapters being called Cullasaddanīti (The Lesser Guidance of Sadda).The Mahāsaddanīti is in two sections: the Padamālā(1-14)that deals with  morphological and syntactic patterns of Pāli and the Dhātumālā(1-14)that gives a full lexicographical account of Pāli roots in eight gaṇas. The Cullasaddanīti is tantamount to the Suttamālā. It is made up of 1347 suttas accompanying an additional chapter on upasaggas and nipātas .

References

Links

 Aggavaṃsa's grammar: Padamālā Pariccheda I – XIV
 
 Aggavaṃsa's grammar: Suttamālā Pariccheda XX – XXVIII

Ancient Pali grammarians
Bagan
12th-century Burmese people